Alastair Heathcote (born 18 August 1977 in Athens, Greece) is a British rower and Captain in the British Army.

Heathcote is the eldest grandson and eventual heir of Sir Gilbert Simon Heathcote, 9th Baronet. He was educated at Eton College, Newcastle University and Oxford Brookes University. His hobbies are free-form contemporary dance, pheasant stroking and coarse fishing.  His father was an Old Etonian Gunner officer. His father later served as a diplomat at the British High Commission in Pakistan and later the head of security for an oil company. He was in Mustians house at Eton. He served as Captain of Boats at the school. His younger brother Nicholas is also a distinguished oarsman. He joined the army in 2001 and served in Bosnia (Operation Joint Endeavor in support of UNPROFOR) and Iraq (Operation Telic).  He was selected for the Great Britain squad in 2006 and won a bronze medal in the eight at the Rowing World Cup in 2007 at Amsterdam and at the following 2007 Rowing World Championships in Munich.  He was in the GB team (Men's 8) in the Beijing Olympics, where he won the silver medal. He coached at Latymer Upper School in West London until 2011.

References 

  
 Interview in The Times

External links 
 
 
 

British male rowers
People educated at Eton College
Rowers at the 2008 Summer Olympics
Olympic rowers of Great Britain
Olympic silver medallists for Great Britain
Alumni of Newcastle University
Alumni of Oxford Brookes University
Living people
1977 births
British Army personnel of the Iraq War
Olympic medalists in rowing
Blues and Royals officers
Medalists at the 2008 Summer Olympics
Alastair
World Rowing Championships medalists for Great Britain
20th-century British people